Winker may refer to:

 Blinders, also known as blinkers or winkers, a piece of horse tack that restrict the horse's vision
 Jesse Winker, an American baseball outfielder currently playing for the Seattle Mariners
 Winker Watson, a fictional character who has his own comic strip in the UK comic The Dandy

See also

 Wink (disambiguation)